The Guzman Water Catchment is a historic private water supply structure in the rural Nalao area of the village of Barrigada in the United States territory of Guam. It is fashioned out of locally gathered stone joined with lime-cement mortar. It was built in 1910 by Baldobino Charfauros on family-owned land, and is one of the oldest surviving rural catchment basins on the island. It is further distinguished from other catchment basins in that it has a substantial floor. These types of structures made it possible for Guamanian families to live on rural holdings where water access was otherwise a significant problem.

The structure was listed on the National Register of Historic Places in 1994.

See also
National Register of Historic Places listings in Guam

References

Buildings and structures on the National Register of Historic Places in Guam
Buildings and structures completed in 1910
1910 establishments in Guam
Barrigada, Guam
Water supply infrastructure on the National Register of Historic Places
Water in Guam